Łucka City is a skyscraper in Warsaw, Poland. It is 120m tall. It has been called "the ugliest skyscraper in Poland." It adjoins Prosta Tower.

References

Wola
Skyscrapers in Warsaw